Abaurregaina / Abaurrea Alta (Abaurregaina is the Basque name, Abaurrea Alta its name in Spanish; both are recognised officially) is a municipality and inhabited locality situated in the province and autonomous community of Navarre (Spanish: Navarra), northern Spain. It is situated some 70 km from the provincial capital, Pamplona. As of 2005 INE figures, the municipality had a population of c. 150 inhabitants.

The municipality has an area of some 20.9 km², and with a median elevation of 1039 m is the highest municipality in Navarre.

References

External links
 Official website of the municipality 
 ABAURREAGAINA/ABAURREA ALTA in the Bernardo Estornés Lasa - Auñamendi Encyclopedia (Euskomedia Fundazioa) 

Municipalities in Navarre